John F. Chironna (July 4, 1928 – October 15, 2010) was an American football and baseball coach. He served as the head coach of the Rhode Island Rams football team in 1961 and 1962, compiling a record of 4–11–3. Chironna was also head coach of the Rhode Island Rams baseball program from 1960 to 1961, tallying a mark of 16–15–1.

Chironna, a native of Westfield, New Jersey, played football and baseball at Westfield High School. He then played both sports at Bucknell University and was named an All-East selection three times. Chironna was inducted into the Bucknell Hall of Fame in 1984 and was named to Bucknell's "Football Team of the Century" in 1996.

Former Notre Dame head coach Charlie Weis credited Chironna for influencing his view of football. Weis said, "John Chironna taught me the game of football. Parcells and Belichick taught me how to navigate at this level, but Chironna, he taught me the game."  Weis taught English and was an assistant coach to Chironna at Morristown High School in Morris County, New Jersey during Weis' early coaching career.

Head coaching record

Football

Baseball

References
General

Specific

1928 births
2010 deaths
American football guards
Bucknell Bison baseball players
Bucknell Bison football players
Rhode Island Rams baseball coaches
Rhode Island Rams football coaches
High school football coaches in New Jersey
Westfield High School (New Jersey) alumni
Sportspeople from Plainfield, New Jersey
People from Westfield, New Jersey
Players of American football from New Jersey
Baseball players from New Jersey